Sir Frederick Tutu Goodwin,  is a Cook Islands politician and former police officer, who was the 6th Queen's Representative to the Cook Islands.

Goodwin joined the Cook Islands Police in 1956.  He served as a constable, then joined the New Zealand Police Force for a short time, before returning to the Cook Islands, where he eventually rose to the rank of Police Superintendent.

He was elected to the Cook Islands Parliament at the 1978 election, representing the seat of Te Au O Tonga for the Democratic Party. He served as assistant minister of energy and works in the government of Tom Davis.  He then worked as a public servant, before being appointed as Queen's Representative in 2001.  In the Birthday Honours 2004 Goodwin was appointed as a Knight Commander of the Order of the British Empire for services to the community

The decision to reappoint Goodwin for another three-year term as Queen's Representative was made in February 2010, and the Queen of New Zealand signed the warrant of appointment in July, to be effective 10 August 2010.
Goodwin stepped down from the role as Queen's Representative on 27 July 2013, being replaced by former Cook Islands Cabinet Minister Tom Marsters

Goodwin's sister-in-law is MP and Deputy Speaker of the Cook Islands Parliament Cassey Eggelton.

References

Knights Commander of the Order of the British Empire
Living people
Members of the Parliament of the Cook Islands
Queen's Representatives in the Cook Islands
New Zealand police officers
Democratic Party (Cook Islands) politicians
Cook Island knights
Cook Island police officers
Year of birth missing (living people)